Beverly Mould and Elizabeth Sayers won in the final 7–6, 4–6, 7–5 against Rosalyn Fairbank and Susan Leo.

Seeds
Champion seeds are indicated in bold text while text in italics indicates the round in which those seeds were eliminated.

 Patricia Medrado /  Cláudia Monteiro (first round)
 Lea Antonoplis /  Alycia Moulton (first round)
 Rosalyn Fairbank /  Susan Leo (final)
 Sophie Amiach /  Corinne Vanier (quarterfinals)

Draw

External links
 1983 Ridgewood Open Doubles Draw

Doubles